Clara, stylized as CLARA, is a French-language feminist magazine based in Paris, France. The magazine was launched in 1987 as a successor of another feminist magazine, Femmes françaises. Gwendoline Lefebvre is one of the contributors.

References

External links

1987 establishments in France
Feminism in France
Feminist magazines
French-language magazines
Magazines established in 1987
Magazines published in Paris
Women's magazines published in France